The International Journal of Urban and Regional Research (IJURR) is a bimonthly peer-reviewed academic journal published by Wiley-Blackwell on behalf of the IJURR Foundation. It was established in 1977 by a group of editors, who partnered with Edward Arnold for publishing. Blackwell (now Wiley-Blackwell) took over publishing from Edward Arnold in 1991. The owners transferred IJURR to a charity (now known as the IJURR Foundation) in 1995. IJURR published quarterly until 2010. The journal covers urban and regional research topics from a social sciences perspective. The journal has an "Interventions" section, and also publishes book reviews, theoretical articles, and symposia (collections of articles on a more narrowly defined topic).

According to the Journal Citation Reports, the journal has a 2015 impact factor of 1.868, ranking it 9th out of 38 journals in the category "Urban Studies", 9th out of 55 journals in the category "Planning & Development", and 21st out of 72 journals in the category "Geography".

References

External links 
 
 The IJURR Foundation

Wiley-Blackwell academic journals
English-language journals
Publications established in 1977
Geography journals
Bimonthly journals
Urban studies and planning journals